Schützenliesel is a 1954 West German period comedy film directed by Rudolf Schündler and starring Herta Staal, Helmuth Schneider and Joe Stöckel. It is based on an operetta of the same title. It was shot at the Spandau Studios in West Berlin and on location at Mittenwald, Garmisch-Partenkirchen and the Lautersee in Bavaria. The film's sets were designed by the art directors Karl Weber and Helmut Nentwig.

Synopsis
In a small Bavarian town at the beginning of the twentieth century, pretty young Gretl is in love with a border guard despite the disapproval of her father. He resents the young man because he is the son of a woman who once spurned him. Things come to a head at the Schützenfest, after the guard courageously rounds up a gang of smugglers.

Cast
 Herta Staal as 	Gretl (Schützenliesel)
 Helmuth Schneider as Stefan Brandner
 Joe Stöckel as Josef Mooshammer
 Gunther Philipp as 	Baron von Simmering
 Susi Nicoletti as 	Cornelia
 Willy Reichert as 	Eduard Steinhagen
 Gretl Fröhlich as Christa - Tochter von Steinhagen
 Peter W. Staub as 	Norbert Feldmaier
 Käthe Haack as Therese Brandner
 Edith Schollwer as 	Mathilde - Schwester von Steinhagen
 Rudolf Carl as 	Hoteldirektor Wurzbach	
 Paul Hörbiger as 	Kaspar

References

Bibliography
 Goble, Alan. The Complete Index to Literary Sources in Film. Walter de Gruyter, 1999.

External links 
 

1954 films
1954 comedy films
German comedy films
West German films
1950s German-language films
Films directed by Rudolf Schündler
1950s German films
Operetta films
Films based on operettas
Films shot at Spandau Studios
Films shot in Bavaria
1950s historical films
German historical films
Films set in the 1900s
Films set in Bavaria

de:Schützenliesel (1954)